The Ground Operations Command (GOC) is a command of the Republic of Korea Army, based in Yongin, Gyeonggi Province.

History
According Lee Min-hyung of The Korea Times, the Ministry of National Defense pushed for the establishment of the Ground Operations Command since 1998, with calls to decrease the number of soldiers and improve operational efficiency under a single control point.

In 2015, the government announced its intention to establish a command to be in charge of the army's ground operations by 2018, after delaying the transfer of control of troops in case of war.

The Ground Operations Command has been created by combining the ROK Army's First and Third Army commands, which defended the eastern and western frontline areas. The establishment of the command was part of President Moon Jae-in's military reform plan. On 16 April 2020, Special Operations Commander, Lieutenant General Nam Young-sin, was promoted to General and appointed as the Ground Operations Commander.

Mission
According to General Woon-yong Kim, the mission entrusted to the Ground Operations Command consists of deterring the full spectrum of threats by maintaining watertight readiness posture even outside open wartime. To this end, the Ground Operations Command guards the Military Demarcation Line in combat readiness.

In the event of an outbreak of war, the Ground Operations Command will serve as the Ground Component Command under the combined forces command of South Korea and the United States.

Organization
The Ground Operations Command consists of:
 36th Homeland Defense Infantry Division 'WHITE TIGER' (36향토보병사단 '백호부대')
 1st Logistics Support Command (1군수지원사령부)
 Capital Corps 'DEVOTION' (수도군단 '충의부대')
Capital Artillery Brigade (수도포병여단)
 17th Infantry Division 'LIGHTNING' (17보병사단 '번개부대')
 51st Homeland Defense Infantry Division 'TOTAL VICTORY' (51향토보병사단 '전승부대')
 55th Homeland Defense Infantry Division 'BEACON FIRE' (55향토보병사단 '봉화부대')
 I Corps 'GWANGGAETO' (1군단 '광개토부대')
 2nd Armored Brigade 'LOYALTY' (2기갑여단 '충성부대')
 30th Armored Brigade 'CERTAIN VICTORY' (30기갑여단 '필승부대')
 1st Artillery Brigade 'FLYING TIGER' (1포병여단 '비호부대')
1st Engineer Brigade (1공병여단)
 1st Infantry Division 'FORWARD' (1보병사단 '전진부대')
 9th Infantry Division 'WHITE HORSE' (9보병사단 '백마부대')
 25th Infantry Division 'FLYING DRAGON' (25보병사단 '비룡부대')
 II Corps 'DOUBLE DRAGONS' (2군단 '쌍용부대')
 3rd Armored Brigade 'LIGHTNING' (3기갑여단 '번개부대')
2nd Artillery Brigade (2포병여단)
2nd Engineer Brigade (2공병여단)
 7th Infantry Division 'SEVEN STARS' (7보병사단 '칠성부대')
 15th Infantry Division 'VICTORY' (15보병사단 '승리부대')
 27th Infantry Division 'LET'S WIN' (27보병사단 '이기자부대')
 III Corps 'MOUNTAINS' (3군단 '산악부대')
 20th Armored Brigade 'EAGLES' (20기갑여단 '독수리부대')
3rd Artillery Brigade (3포병여단)
3rd Engineer Brigade (3공병여단)
 12th Infantry Division 'EULJI' (12보병사단 '을지부대')
 21st Infantry Division 'MT. BAEKDU' (21보병사단 '백두산부대')
 V Corps 'VICTORIOUS ADVANCE' (5군단 '승진부대')
 1st Armored Brigade 'BLITZ' (1기갑여단 '전격부대')
5th Artillery Brigade 'VICTORIOUS ADVANCE' (5포병여단 '승진포병부대')
5th Engineer Brigade (5공병여단)
 3rd Infantry Division 'WHITE SKULL' (3보병사단 '백골부대')
 6th Infantry Division 'BLUE STAR' (6보병사단 '청성부대')
 VI Corps 'ADVANCE' (6군단 '진군부대')
 5th Armored Brigade 'IRON STORM' (5기갑여단 '철풍부대')
6th Artillery Brigade (6포병여단)
6th Engineer Brigade (6공병여단)
 5th Infantry Division 'THE KEY' (5보병사단 '열쇠부대')
 28th Infantry Division 'INVINCIBLE TYPHOON' (28보병사단 '무적태풍부대')
 VII Maneuver Corps 'VANGUARD' (7기동군단 '북진선봉부대')
7th Artillery Brigade (7포병여단)
7th Engineer Brigade (7공병여단)
 Capital Mechanized Infantry Division 'FIERCE TIGER' (수도기계화보병사단 '맹호사단')
 8th Maneuver Division 'TUMBLER' (8기동사단 '오뚜기부대')
 11th Maneuver Division 'HWARANG' (11기동사단 '화랑부대')
 2nd Quick Response Division 'FURIOUS WAVE' (2신속대응사단 '노도부대')
 VIII Corps 'DRAGONS OF THE EAST SEA' (8군단 '동해충용부대')
1st Mountain Brigade 'TAEBAEK' (1산악여단 '태백부대')
 23rd Security Brigade 'IRON WALL' (23경비여단 '철벽부대')
 102nd Armored Brigade 'SUNRISE' (102기갑여단 '일출부대')
 22nd Infantry Division 'YULGOK' (22보병사단 '율곡부대')

References

Military units and formations established in 2019
Military units and formations of the South Korean Army
2019 establishments in South Korea